The 1993 Azerbaijan Top League was the second season of the Azerbaijan Top League and was contested by 20 clubs with 2 points awarded for a win, 1 for a draw and no points were awarded for a defeat. Neftchi Baku were unable to defend their championship, with Karabakh Agdam becoming the champions.

The 20 participating teams where divided into two groups of 10, and faced each other twice. The top two clubs at the end of the 18 games qualified for the championship play-off matches, whilst the bottom three clubs were relegated. However Nefteqaz were spared relegation after Daşqın Zaqatala were relegated due to their financial problems. At the start of the season Taraggi Baku changed their name to Azneftyag Baku, whilst newly promoted Kyur Samukh became Boz Qurd Samukh.

Stadia and locations

Note: Table lists in alphabetical order.

First round

Group A

Table

Results

Group B

Table

Results

Championship play-offs

Semifinals

Final

Season statistics

Top scorers

References

External links
Azerbaijan 1993 RSSSF
APL Stats

Azerbaijan Premier League seasons
Azer
1
Azer
1